Long Ballong, now known as Long Puak, is an abandoned village found less than 0.5 kilometres away from Long Puak in Sarawak.

Before the village was discontinued, due to un-strategic geographical location, the village was known to be the center for the surrounding villages like Long Banga, Long Peluan and Long Lamei. These villages sent their children to Long Ballong for education.

Since the village was abandoned in the early 1980s, the villagers have moved to Long Puak.

Sarawak